The 2021–22 Denmark Series was the 57th season of the Denmark Series, the fifth-tier of the Danish football league structure organised by the Danish FA (DBU). The season marked a transitional phase in the structure of the Danish leagues.

This season, the league was divided into four groups of ten teams each. After the regular season (27 rounds), the top four teams in the four groups were promoted for a spot in the 2022–23 Danish 3rd Division. The relegation from 2021-22 Denmark Series was based on which four team is relegated from the 2021–22 Danish 3rd Division depending on the teams are from east or west of the Great Belt

Group 1

Group 2

Group 3

Group 4

Relegation rules 
The relegation to tier 6, was based on the four teams coming from the 2021–22 Danish 3rd Division season. therefore, six teams from group 1 and 2 (east Denmark) were relegated and two teams from Group 3 and 4 (west Denmark) were relegated.

5
Denmark Series
Denmark Series seasons